Grown Woman may refer to:

 Adult females

Music

"Grown Woman (song)", a 2010 song by Kelly Rowland
"Grown Woman (Beyoncé song)", 2013